Comedy Central Romania is the Romanian version of Comedy Central. The channel broadcasts comedy oriented shows. It was launched on 18 September 2016, replacing Comedy Central Extra Adria in the country. Since then it has produced local Romanian content, and became widely popular.

Programming 
Shows broadcast on this channel include:

Current

Former

References

External links 
 Comedy Central Romania

Comedy Central
Romanian-language television stations
Television stations in Romania
Television channels and stations established in 2016